Francis "Frank" Townsend Hunter (June 28, 1894 – December 2, 1981) was an American tennis player who won an Olympic gold medal.

Early and personal life
Hunter graduated from Cornell University in 1916, where he was a member of the Quill and Dagger society and the ice hockey team.

Hunter was the second husband of the actress Lisette Verea in 1954.

Tennis career

Hunter was a singles finalist at Wimbledon in 1923 (where he beat Gordon Lowe, then lost to Bill Johnston).

Hunter won a gold medal at the 1924 Paris Olympics, in the men's doubles event with partner Vincent Richards.

He reached the U.S. championships singles final in 1928 (where he beat Jack Crawford and George Lott, then lost to Henri Cochet in five sets).

He reached his third Grand Slam singles final at the U.S. championships in 1929 (where he beat R. Norris Williams, losing in five sets to Bill Tilden). He was ranked World No. 4 in 1929 by A. Wallis Myers of The Daily Telegraph and World No. 5 in another Myers list in September the same year.

Hunter turned professional in mid January 1931 joining Bill Tilden. He reached the final of the U.S. Pro championships in 1933 (losing to Vincent Richards). As well as playing on the pro tour, Hunter was also a promoter, including promoting the first Perry-Vines tour in 1937 with S. Howard Voshell.

Grand Slam finals

Singles: 3 runners-up

Doubles: 3 titles

Mixed doubles: 4 (2 titles, 2 runners-up)

References

External links
 
 
 
 
 
 
 

1894 births
1981 deaths
American male tennis players
Cornell Big Red men's tennis players
Olympic gold medalists for the United States in tennis
Sportspeople from New York City
Sportspeople from New Rochelle, New York
International Tennis Hall of Fame inductees
Tennis people from New York (state)
Tennis players at the 1924 Summer Olympics
United States National champions (tennis)
Wimbledon champions (pre-Open Era)
Grand Slam (tennis) champions in mixed doubles
Grand Slam (tennis) champions in men's doubles
Medalists at the 1924 Summer Olympics
Professional tennis players before the Open Era
Cornell Big Red men's ice hockey players
Professional tennis promoters